Doğu is a Turkish family name and masculine given name. In Turkish, "Doğu" means "East" or "The East"

People

Given name
 Doğu Perinçek, Turkish politician

Surname
 Ersan Dogu, Turkish footballer
 Sinem Doğu, Turkish female ice hockey player
 Yaşar Doğu, Turkish sport wrestler

Ships
, a Turkish passenger ship requisitioned by Germany on completion in 1939

Turkish-language surnames
Turkish masculine given names